Ahmaddin Abdul Rahman (born April 1972), sometimes referred to as Dato Ahmaddin, is the incumbent Minister of Home Affairs (MOHA) in Brunei since 2022, the former Deputy Minister of Finance and Economy (MoFE), and the chairman of both Royal Brunei Technical Services (RBTS) and Brunei Darussalam Central Bank (BDCB). In addition to serving on a number of government committees dealing with ease of doing business, corporatisation and public-private partnerships, manpower planning and employment, FDIs and downstream industries, and sukuk management, Dato Ahmaddin currently sits on the boards of government-linked companies in a variety of sectors, including banking, medical, oil and gas, logistics, and real estate.

Biography

Early life and education 
Ahmaddin is born in April 1972 and at the Universiti Brunei Darussalam (UBD), Ahmaddin earned a Bachelor of Arts (Hons) in Management Studies in 1996.

Career

Early career 
In 1996, Ahmaddin began working with the government. He also served as the acting director of research and planning for the public service department, controller of customs for the royal customs and excise department, and director of administration and finance within the ministry. Ahmaddin began holding a number of important roles in the MoFE, including Permanent Secretary of Policy and Investment, Policy, and Performance, all of which he held from 24 August 2017 to 22 October 2015. On 30 January 2018, he was appointed as the deputy minister of finance and the economy. Moreover, he was the director of Royal Brunei Airlines (RBA) from 8 June 2018 until his resignation on 4 January 2021.

Ministerial office 
On 27 June 2021, Dato Ahmaddin was appointed as the chairman of BDCB, replacing Crown Prince Al-Muhtadee Billah. He would later be reappointed as the Minister of Home Affairs, following Sultan Hassanal Bolkiah's titah on 7 June 2022. The youth should cultivate the proper mindset, attitude, and abilities, according to Dato Ahmaddin during the 5th Youth Town Hall Brunei on 5 December 2022, in order to effectively contribute to national development. Additionally, he mentioned that in order to realize the development of the entire country, kids must be able to meet the requirements for good leadership and teamwork. On 9 March 2023, the MOHA will support the budget theme of "Creating A Successful Future Together" by concentrating on three goals, according to Ahmaddin in his introduction to the allocation for the Ministry and its departments totaling over B$136 million. The Minister of Home Affairs claims that one of the goals is Security and Well-Being.

Honours
Ahmaddin was bestowed the title of Yang Berhormat (The Honourable). Moreover, he has earned the following honours; 
  Order of Setia Negara Brunei Second Class (PSNB) – Dato Seri Setia (15 July 2022)
   Order of Seri Paduka Mahkota Brunei First Class (SPMB) – Dato Seri Paduka
  Pingat Indah Kerja Baik (PIKB)

References

Living people
Government ministers of Brunei
1972 births
Interior ministers of Brunei
Bruneian businesspeople
Bruneian Muslims